Alfarita Constantia Marley  (née Anderson; born 25 July 1946) is a Cuban-born Jamaican singer, songwriter and  entrepreneur. She is the widow of reggae legend Bob Marley. Along with Marcia Griffiths and Judy Mowatt, she was a member of the reggae vocal group the I Threes, the backing vocalists for Bob Marley and the Wailers.

Early life
Rita was born in Santiago de Cuba, to Leroy Anderson and Cynthia "Beda" Jarrett, her parents moved to Kingston, Jamaica, when she was three months old. In her memoir No Woman No Cry: My Life with Bob Marley, she describes how she was raised by her Aunt Viola after her parents separated. She was raised in Trenchtown in Kingston, Jamaica.

Career
The Soulettes released recordings including rocksteady tunes such as "Time for Everything", "Turn Turn Turn" (released in 1966, written by folk singer Pete Seeger) and "A Deh Pon Dem". "Friends and Lovers", "One More Chance" and "That Ain't Right" (featuring harmony vocals by the Wailers), as well as a duet by Rita and Bunny Wailer, "Bless You" were issued years later on the Lovers and Friends album.

After those recordings for the Studio One (record label) coached by Bob, Rita married Bob Marley around February 1966, just before her husband moved to Wilmington, Delaware for a few months to make a living working at the Dupont Hotel there. Bob was replaced by her cousin Constantine "Vision" Walker, who recorded a few songs as a member of The Wailers during this period, with Rita providing harmonies.

The Wailers 
Upon Bob's return at the end of the summer of 1966, Bunny Wailer, Peter Tosh and Bob created their independent label Wail 'n' Soul'm, which released several Bob Marley and the Wailers, as well as Peter Tosh and the Wailers 45RPM single records including Bend Down Low, Hypocrites and Tosh's Dem Haffi Get a Beatin''' in 1966-1968.

As Bunny was jailed in 1968 for cannabis possession, Rita joined the Wailers, replacing Bunny for a few months. It is at that time that The Wailers met U.S. singer Johnny Nash, who produced a series of Wailers rocksteady recordings. In April 1968 Nash's manager Danny Sims signed Peter Tosh, Bob, and Rita Marley to exclusive publishing, management, and production contracts in exchange for a few dollars and an opportunity to record in Kingston for the New York-based JAD label owned by Johnny Nash, musician Arthur Jenkins and Danny Sims.

Musicians on this 1968 Wailers session feature Peter Tosh and the Marleys. Rita sang vocals on a dozen fine rocksteady and soul tracks, most of which were not issued at the time. New recordings of Bend Down Low and Mellow Mood got issued as a single in the U.S.A. under the name "Bob, Rita and Peter".

The original 1968 sessions including all of the original musicians — and without the horns — eventually surfaced on the Freedom Time album issued in 2003 by JAD's partner in France (55 Records) after producer Bruno Blum finally mixed them in Paris from the original four-track tapes. One song, "Play Play Play", features Rita Marley on lead vocals with harmonies sung by Peter and Bob. Another Rita Marley sung tune, "Lonely Girl", and a pop duet with Bob, "Milk Shake and Potato Chips", were finally released in 2003 on the Rebel JAD/55 long box set.

 The I Three 
Following the birth of Bob and Rita's second child, Ziggy Marley in 1968, Bob returned to Delaware in 1969 to work on the night shift in a Chrysler factory. Bunny had returned to the Wailers at the end of 1968 and Rita did not record with Bob until 1974, when her husband formed the I Three harmony vocal group featuring Marcia Griffiths and Judy Mowatt to replace Peter and Bunny, who had left the band in 1973.

Together with the I Three, Bob Marley & the Wailers recorded the album Natty Dread in 1974, rising to international stardom with the track "No Woman No Cry". It was followed by the 1976 album Rastaman Vibration featuring the track "Roots, Rock, Reggae". On 3 December 1976 two days before the Smile Jamaica Concert, a large free concert organized by Bob Marley with the support of Jamaican Prime Minister Michael Manley, Rita, Bob, and manager Don Taylor were wounded in an assault on the Marley home by gunmen affiliated with Manley's enemies. Rita survived a shot to the head and Taylor sustained serious injuries from being shot in the leg. Bob had a bullet skid his chest and wound his arm, but nevertheless played this major show in Kingston with Rita by his side.

 Later years 
In 1986, Rita decided to convert Bob Marley's home into the Bob Marley Museum. She is the Founder and Chairperson of the Robert Marley Foundation, Bob Marley Trust, and the Bob Marley Group of Companies.

In 2000, Marley created the Rita Marley Foundation, a non-governmental, not-for-profit, non-partisan organization that works to alleviate poverty and hunger in developing countries. It targets elderly and youth. It has given out a number of scholarships to music students in Ghana. It hosts the annual Africa Unite concerts which strives to spread global awareness about issues that affect Africa and to develop lasting solutions. She adopted 35 children in Ethiopia and has assisted over 200 children in Konkonuru Methodist School in Ghana.

In 1996, Rita Marley was conferred the Order of Distinction by the Jamaican government for her contributions to the development of Jamaican music and culture.

On 3 August 2013, she was made an honorary citizen of Ghana by the Ghanaian government after living there for many years. In November 2015 Marley was awarded an honorary Doctor of Letters degree by the University of the West Indies. In 2017 she received her second honorary Doctorate degree by University of Fort Hare, South Africa.

In 2019, Rita Marley was honoured by the Jamaican Government with it’s fifth highest national honour, Order of Jamaica (OJ).

In September 2016, Rita Marley suffered a stroke while on a visit to Miami to attend a special event and has kept a low public profile since. She made her first public appearance at an award ceremony in Kingston on March 9, 2019 along with her fellow I Three members Marcia Griffiths and Judy Mowatt to accept the Iconic Award (For a Duo/Group),given by the Jamaica Reggae Industry Association.

Children
Rita has six children, three with Bob and three from other relationships. Bob adopted Rita's two other children as his own and they have the Marley name. Bob has 11 children in total: three born to Rita, the two of Rita's that he adopted and the remaining six with separate women. Rita's children are, in order of birth:

 Sharon Marley, born 23 November 1964 (daughter of Rita from a previous relationship but then adopted by Marley after his marriage with Rita)
 Cedella Marley born 23 August 1967  
 "Ziggy Marley" (David Nesta Marley), born 17 October 1968 
 Stephen Marley, born 20 April 1972
 Stephanie Marley, born 17 August 1974 (from an extramarital affair with Owen “Ital Tacky” Stewart a former Jamaican soccer player) Nevertheless Bob adopted her as one of his own, giving her official recognition as one of his children, thereby entitling her to his estate.
 Serita Stewart, born 11 August 1985 (born after Bob’s passing to Owen “Ital Tacky” Stewart, Stephanie biological father)

Discography
1966: Pied Piper, Rio
1967: "Pied Piper" (single, on Club Ska '67), Mango
1980: Rita Marley - Trident
1981: Who Feels It Knows It, Shanachie Records
1982: "Harambe (Working Together for Freedom)", Shanachie Records
1986: “Beginning”, I-Three, EMI / TUFF GONG
1988: We Must Carry On, Shanachie Records
1990: Beauty of God's, Shanachie Records
1990: Good Girls Culture, Shanachie Records
1990: One Draw, Shanachie Records
2003: Sings Bob Marley...and Friends, Shanachie Records
2004: Play Play, Universal Music
2005: Sunshine After Rain2006: Gifted Fourteen CarnationAppearances
1966: The Soulettes - Time for Everything (Jamaica All Stars compilation album), Studio One
1968: The Wailers - Pay Play Play and Rhapsody (released on the Freedom Time album in 2003), JAD
1983: John Denver - "World Game" (with The Wailers and Marcia Griffiths), It's About Time, RCA
1996: Khaled - "Ouelli El Darek" (with the I Three), Sahra, Wrasse Records

Collaborations
1995: Rita Marley / Ignacio Scola / Gregorio Paniagua: Spectacles for tribuffalos, Tabata Musica y Letra
2006: Fergie / Rita Marley & The I-3's: "Mary Jane Shoes" - The DutchessBooks
Rita Marley, Hettie Jones (2004). No Woman, No Cry: My Life with Bob Marley'', Hyperion 

Harambe for the Holidays: Vibrant Holiday Cooking with Rita Marley. Book by Cedella Marley and Rita Marley (2014)

References

External links
  – official site
 
 
 Rita Marley biography at Starpulse.com
 Rita Marley biography at VH1

1946 births
Living people
Converts to the Rastafari movement
20th-century Jamaican women singers
Jamaican Rastafarians
Jamaican reggae musicians
Jamaican reggae singers
R
Musicians from Kingston, Jamaica
People from Santiago de Cuba
The Wailers members
Recipients of the Order of Distinction
Shanachie Records artists